I Could've Been a Drum is an album by the pianist Anthony Coleman and the saxophonist Roy Nathanson, released on the Tzadik label in 1997.

Reception

In his review for AllMusic, Marc Gilman notes that "this duet collaboration between Anthony Coleman and Roy Nathanson has its high points, but fails to produce music of the outstanding quality of Coleman's other projects".

Track listing
All compositions by Anthony Coleman and Roy Nathanson except as indicated
 "Ija Mia" (Traditional) – 2:56   
 "L' Amore" – 6:44   
 "Mr. Pig Gets a Balloon" (Roy Nathanson) – 2:39   
 "Rumle" – 3:37   
 "Devotional Song #1" – 6:42   
 "(If I Were a) Drum" (Anthony Coleman) – 2:52   
 "Soprano Ballad" – 3:27   
 "Ija Mia 2" (Traditional) – 3:23   
 "Ben" – 3:24   
 "Blues" – 4:42

Personnel
Anthony Coleman – piano, organ, sampler
Roy Nathanson – saxophones, recorder 
Brad Jones – bass 
Marc Ribot – guitar
Technical
John Zorn - executive producer
Ray Dobbins - cover photographer

References

Tzadik Records albums
Anthony Coleman albums
1997 albums